Destination Murder is a 1950 American crime film noir directed by Edward L. Cahn.  The drama features Joyce MacKenzie, Stanley Clements and Hurd Hatfield.

Plot
During a five-minute movie intermission, Jackie Wales leaves a theater, gets into a car, changes into a messenger's outfit, rings the doorbell of Arthur Mansfield, shoots him, then rushes back to the theater and his date.

After her father is shot, Laura Mansfield sees the killer hurdle the house's gate. At the police station, she looks at suspects in a lineup. One of them is Jackie, whom she chats with outside the station, not revealing who she is. Laura lets him drive her home, then sees Jackie hurdle the gate as her dad's murderer did.
s 
Police Lt. Brewster, the lead homicide investigator, ignores her tip and charges Arthur Mansfield's business competitor, Frank Niles, with the crime. Laura begins dating Jackie to keep an eye on him. He loses money gambling and goes to the Vogue nightclub to get a payoff from the men who run it. Instead, the boss, Armitage, brutally beats Jackie while the club's manager, Stretch Norton, starts the music of a player piano to drown out the noise.

Laura is frustrated by Brewster's seeming lack of action in solving her father's case. She takes a job as a cigarette girl at Vogue to learn more about Jackie's employer. Armitage and Stretch have a conversation, during which they reveal the fact that Niles hired Jackie to kill Mansfield. Alice Wentworth, a gold-digger whom Armitage loves but who flirts with Stretch, goes to Jackie with a plan: Write a letter confessing to the murder, implicating Armitage for hiring him, then get a $5,000 blackmail payment that Alice will split with him. The scheme works.

From the time they spend together, Laura ends up falling in love with Stretch and confessing her true identity. She does not realize that Stretch is the actual boss of the gang; Armitage works for him, as a front. Stretch persuades Alice to double-cross Jackie; she gives him Jackie's confession letter. Then Armitage starts the player piano, kills Alice, and burns Jackie's letter. Stretch also orders Armitage to kill Jackie on the way home.

Eliminating loose ends, Stretch drugs Armitage, puts a gun in his hand, and acts as if his partner is about to betray him, getting Laura to shoot Armitage. Brewster, regardless, does not believe the case is solved, and recruits Laura and Niles for a sting operation in Norton's office, with Niles offering to take Armitage's place. The recorded conversation implicates mastermind Norton. He attempts to take Laura hostage, but Brewster frees her and the two men fight. When Norton has the upper hand and is about to kill Brewster, police detective Mulcahy shoots and kills Norton.

Cast
 Joyce MacKenzie as Laura Mansfield
 Stanley Clements as Jackie Wales
 Hurd Hatfield as Stretch Norton
 Albert Dekker as Armitage
 Myrna Dell as Alice Wentworth
 James Flavin as Police Lt. Brewster
 John Dehner as Frank Niles
 Richard Emory as Police Sgt. Mulcahy
 Suzette Harbin as Harriet, Nightclub Maid
 Buddy Swan as Arthur, Blue Streak Messenger
 Bert Wenland as Dave, Blue Streak Messenger
 Franklyn Farnum as Arthur Mansfield, Laura's Father
 Steve Gibson and the Redcaps as Singing Group

Release and reception
Destination Murder was release June 6, 1950.

Herb Rau, writing for The Miami News in 1950, called the premise ridiculous and the plot confused. Much later, in a 2011 synopsis for the website AllMovie, critic Hans J. Wollstein agreed that the plot is baffling and attributed much of that confusion to important elements lacking in the screenplay:

Note: Screenwriter Don Martin is not the famed Mad cartoonist of the same name.

References

External links
 
 
  (Warner Bros. Archive Collection)

1950 crime drama films
1950 films
1950s crime thriller films
American crime thriller films
American crime drama films
1950s English-language films
American black-and-white films
Film noir
RKO Pictures films
Films directed by Edward L. Cahn
1950s American films